The 152d Air Operations Group (152 AOG) is a unit of the New York Air National Guard, stationed at Hancock Field Air National Guard Base, Syracuse, New York. If called into active federal service, the group is gained by United States Air Forces Europe (USAFE).

Mission
The 152d Air Operations Group's primary day-to-day mission is to augment and support the 603d Air Operations Center, located at Ramstein Air Base, Germany, a part of United States Air Forces Europe (USAFE).  The 603d AOC and 152d AOG work together to set up and run an  AN/USQ-163 "Falconer" weapons system, for the European and African theater of operations.

Squadrons

152 Combat Operations Squadron -  Commander,  Col Doreen Chemotti------------------------------ Superintendent, CMSgt Toby French 
152 Air Communication Squadron - Commander,  Lt Col Doug Schafer-----------------------------------------  Superintendent, CMSgt Brian Matthews 
152 Air Intelligence Squadron - Commander,   Lt Col Robison Ihle, ----------------------------------------------- Superintendent, CMSgt Daniel Lasky

Components
The Air Operations Center (AOC) is the senior element of the Theater Air Control System. In the event of hostilities, the Joint Force Commander assigns a Joint Forces Air Component Commander (JFACC) to lead the AOC weapon system. Quite often the Commander, Air Force Forces (COMAFFOR) is assigned the JFACC position for planning and executing theater-wide air and space forces. When there is more than one service working in the AOC it is called the Joint Air and Space Operations Center. In cases of Allied or Coalition (multinational) operations, the AOC is called a Combined Air and Space Operations Center.

There are usually five divisions in the AOC. These separate, but distinct, organizations fuse information that eventually becomes the Air Tasking Order. The divisions are the Strategy Division, the Combat Plans Division, the Combat Operations Division, the Intelligence, Surveillance, Reconnaissance Division and the Air Mobility Division. The Air Communications Squadron supports all aspects of the mission systems and ensures they have the tools needed to generate the Air Tasking Order and execute Air power.

The AN/USQ-163 Falconer is the weapons systems used by the JFACC and within Air Operations Centers by the United States Air Force combat forces to plan and execute military missions utilizing airborne resources.  It is used to generate the Air Tasking Order and execute Air power.

History
The 152d Air Operations Group was initially established at Fort Clayton in the Signal Corps during 1939 as the Signal Aircraft Warning Company, Panama.  In 1942 the company expanded to battalion size.  It provided air defense of the Panama Canal Zone until December 1942, when it was inactivated.

The battalion, now the 558th Signal Aircraft Warning Battalion was activated again in the China Burma India Theater in 1944.  The 558th served in combat until the surrender of Japan and remained in theater until January 1946, when it returned to the United States and was inactivated.

In March 1946, the battalion was transferred to the Air Corps, redesignated the 152d Aircraft Warning and Control Group and allotted to the National Guard.

In March 1948, the group was activated and federally recognized in the New York Air National Guard at Westchester County Airport as the air control element of the 52d Fighter Wing.  It was assigned three aircraft warning and control squadrons in New York and New Jersey, and an aircraft control squadron stationed with the group headquarters.

In August 1951 the group and its squadrons were called to active duty in the expansion of the United States Air Force during the Korean War and moved to Grenier Air Force Base, New Hampshire as part of Air Defense Command (ADC).  The unit did not deploy to Korea, instead it moved to Canada where it operated new radar sites being constructed for Northeast Air Command.  In December the group was inactivated and returned to state control.

The unit was moved to the White Plains Armory and eventually to Roslyn Air National Guard Station on Long Island.  The mobilization command for the group changed from ADC to Tactical Air Command (TAC).  In 1954, the unit was redesignated the 152d Tactical Control Group and changed its mission from air defense to control of tactical aircraft in both offensive and defensive combat.  The group was called to active duty during the Berlin Crisis of 1961 and deployed to Germany, where it operated a network of radar sites until being once again returned to state control in 1962.

In 1984 the 152d moved to Hancock Field Air National Guard Base, near Syracuse.  It became the 152d Air Control Group in 1992 as the Air Force dropped the terms "Tactical" and "Strategic" from its units names with the inactivation of TAC and Strategic Air Command.  Air Combat Command became the new mobilization command for the 152d.

In 2000, the unit's federal mission was changed to augment the Air Operations Center at Ramstein Air Force Base, Germany, for the United States Air Forces Europe (USAFE). The Air Operations Center provides planning, direction, and control of assigned Air Forces. They also direct activities of forces and monitor actions of both enemy and friendly forces.

Lineage
 Activated in December 1939 as the Signal Aircraft Warning Company, Panama
 Redesignated 558th Signal Battalion, Aircraft Warning on 15 January 1942
 Inactivated on 1 December 1942
 Redesignated 558th Signal Aircraft Warning Battalion and activated on 10 August 1944
 Inactivated on 11 January 1946
 Converted, redesignated 152d Aircraft Warning & Control Group on 24 May 1946 and allotted to the National Guard
 Extended federal recognition and activated on 15 Mar 1948
 Called to active duty on 1 August 1951
 Inactivated on 20 Dec 1952 and returned to the National Guard
 Extended federal recognition and activated on 20 Dec 1952
 Redesignated 152d Tactical Control Group on 1 December 1954
 Federalized and placed on active duty in Oct 1961
 Released from active duty and returned to New York state control c 1 Nov 1962
 Redesignated 152d Air Control Group c. 16 June 1992
 Redesignated 152d Air Operations Group on 1 August 1996
 Federalized and placed on active duty in December 2001
 Released from active duty and returned to New York state control
 Federalized and placed on active duty in January 2003
 Released from active duty and returned to New York state control in February 2003

Assignments
 Panama Canal Department, December 1939
 Signal Aircraft Warning Service, XXVI Fighter Command c. 9 June 1942 - 1 December 1942
 Tenth Air Force, 10 August 1944
 33d Fighter Group, October 1944
 North Burma Task Force, c. April 1945
 Tenth Air Force, 1945 - 11 January 1946
 52d Fighter Wing, 15 March 1948
 New York Air National Guard, 1 November 1950
 First Air Force, 1 August 1951
 Eastern Air Defense Force, August 1951
 32d Air Division, 6 February 1952
 Northeast Air Command, April 1952
 New York Air National Guard, 10 December 1952
 Ninth Air Force, 1 October 1961
 United States Air Forces Europe, October 1961
 New York Air National Guard, 1 November 1962
 New York Air National Guard, 1 December 2001-Undetermined; 1 January 2003-Undetermined; 1 February 2003 – Present

Stations

 Fort Clayton, Panama Canal Zone, December 1939
 Albrook Field, Panama Canal Zone, by July 1942 - 1 December 1942
 Dinjan, India, 10 August 1944,
 Myitkyina, Burma, ca. April 1945
 Camp Kilmer, New Jersey, January 1946 - 11 January 1946
 Westchester County Airport, New York, 15 March 1948
 Grenier Air Force Base, New Hampshire, August 1951
 Pepperrell Air Force Base Labrador, April 1952 - 10 December 1952
 Westchester County Airport, New York 10 December 1952 - ca. 1953
 White Plains State Armory, New York, c. 1954
 Roslyn Air National Guard Station, New York, c. 1959
 Mannheim Air Station, Germany October 1961
 Roslyn Air National Guard Station, New York, 1 November 1962
 Hancock Field Air National Guard Base, New York,  May 1983
 Ramstein Air Base, December  2001
 Hancock Field Air National Guard Base, New York, unknown
 Unknown - January 2003
 Hancock Field Air National Guard Base, New York, February 2003 – present

Weapons Systems Operated
 AN/USQ-163 Falconer

See also

References

 Gross, Charles J (1996), The Air National Guard and the American Military Tradition, United States Dept. of Defense,

External links
 New York Air National Guard website
 152d Air Operations Group
 152d AOS History and Lineage

Air Operations 0152
Military operations in Syracuse, New York